The Great Recession in South America, as it mainly consists of commodity exporters, was not directly affected by the financial turmoil, even if the bond markets of Brazil, Argentina, Colombia and Venezuela have been hit.

On the other hand, the continent experienced a tough agricultural crisis at the beginning of 2008. Food prices have increased a lot, due to a lack of arable land. One of the main reasons for the loss of agricultural land was the high value offered by the production of biofuels. However, second generation biofuel processes is slowly being implemented in order to  extend the amount of biofuel that can be produced sustainably by using biomass consisting of the residual non-food parts of current crops, such as stems, leaves and husks. Other crops that are not used for food purposes (non food crops), such as switchgrass, grass, jatropha, whole crop maize, and miscanthus could be used to produce biofuels without starving the population that are dependent on food products. Industry waste products (i.e., woodchips, skins and pulp) from fruit pressing would also replace the need to waste arable land for biofuels; possibly improving the South American economy. Food prices, rising since 2002, ascended from 2006, reaching a peak during the first quarter of 2008. In one year the average price of food rose by about 50%.

Then South American countries were affected by both the global slowdown and the decrease in food prices due to the declining demand. In June 2008, the Economic Commission for Latin America and the Caribbean (ECLAC) declared it expected a 4% growth for 2009. However at the end of the year it predicted that the year 2009 would put an end to six years of prosperity during which Latin America has benefited from high raw material prices. Production in the region is likely to decline and unemployment to increase. However, the Center for Economic and Policy Research has estimated that the region may be able to cope with the global downturn with the right macro-economic policies, as these countries no longer depend on the U.S. economy.

Countries

Brazil

While previously thought immune to the global financial crisis, the economy of Brazil shrank 3.5% in the fourth quarter of 2008, with industrial production in January 2009, 17.2% below that of January 2008. Growth for 2008 as a whole was 5.1%. Capital spending fell 9.8% in the fourth quarter while household consumption fell 2% from the third quarter. Another report, in The Wall Street Journal, showed drop in gross domestic product of 13.6% in the 4th quarter of 2008 on an annualized rate and a drop in industrial production for December, 2008 to a rate 18.6% lower than December 2007, with a loss of over 700,000 jobs between November 2008 and February 2009.

Argentina
As the second-largest economy in South America and an important exporter of both machinery and agricultural goods, Argentina has been affected by the global slowdown. The country has been seeing slower economic growth recently, seeing its growth rate forecast reduced from nearly 7% in 2008 to 0% in 2009, and due to the steep drop in commodities prices, plus a long, damaging drought in the farm provinces, local economists believe the country may fall into recession. To combat the effects of the financial crisis, the government announced a $32 billion stimulus package that is intended to create some 380,000 jobs and favor small and medium-sized businesses, with investment in infrastructure, gas pipelines and electricity generators, as well as the completion by 2010 of a new nuclear power plant.  However, former President Néstor Kirchner, the husband of the current president, Cristina Fernández de Kirchner and leader of the ruling Justicialist Party, said in a speech on February 17, 2009, that due to the international crisis, Argentina in 2009 will face "the most difficult year in the last century."

Ecuador
Ecuador is seeking ways to default on sovereign debts incurred under the government of Gustavo Noboa, which the present government deems to have been incurred illegally. If Ecuador defaults, it will be the first developing country to default on sovereign debt since the crisis began.

Caribbean Islands
The International Monetary Fund (IMF) said as soon as February 2008 that a U.S. slowdown would hurt the economies of the Caribbean Islands, especially those in the Eastern Islands. Indeed, the tourism sector makes up a large part of the Islands' economies, so that they are heavily dependent on the number of U.S. visitors each year. However, the lower inflation and currency depreciation in several Latin American and Caribbean nations can have offset this impact of the financial crisis, sustaining the activity.

Timeline of the Great Recession across all continents

See also 

Great Recession in the Americas
Great Recession in the United States

References

Economic history of South America
S01
Economic policy in South America
2000s in South America
2010s in South America
Economic crises in Argentina
Economic crises in Brazil
Economy of South America
Recessions
2000s economic history
2010s economic history